Ron Furmanek is an American Grammy nominated music producer and filmographer who has produced over 200 CDs. His most recent work, which includes six Kingston Trio titles, is currently released on RichKat Records, through Collectors Choice Music in the United States.

Biography
Ron Furmanek is one of the pioneers of compact disc compilations and re-issues, having produced over 200 CD titles since 1988, most notably Nipper’s Greatest Hits for RCA, The Capitol Collectors Series and the EMI Legendary Masters Series. His Les Paul: The Legend and the Legacy has been nominated for the Grammy.  The Frank Sinatra - The Capitol Years box (which went gold) offers one particular selection that not even the staunchest of Sinatra collectors recognized: a 1958 Billy May arrangement called "Here Goes".

He is an authority on the Beatles’ recorded and film and video history.  His first “official” gig regarding the group dates back to research and consulting work for Capitol's vinyl-only releases Rarities of 1980 and 1982's Reel Music.  Since 1987 he has color corrected the visuals and remixed the audio (when applicable) on all of The Beatles promotional films, The Beatles: The First U.S. Visit, The Beatles at Shea Stadium, Let It Be, and Magical Mystery Tour.

Partial filmography
1972               The Beatles "Braverman's Condensed Cream of the Beatles" 12 minute short subject Chuck Braverman Supplied ALL Archival footage and Photos
1972               Geraldo Rivera's "Good Night America" television show ABC TV  Archival Footage and Research
1976               The Beatles "Rock & Roll Music"  TV Promo Spot  Capitol Records Archival Footage 
1977               The Beatles Forever NBC Syd Vinnedge Productions Archival Footage and Research
1978               Echoes of The 60s  ABC TV Special ALA Productions Archival Footage and Research
1978               Heroes of Rock and Roll  2-Hour ABC Special Archival Footage and Research
1979               The Who The Kids Are Alright Archival Feature Film New World Pictures Footage and Research
1980               America's top Ten hosted by Casey Kasem weekly Archival Footage and Research
1980               The Kinks "One For the Road" Time Life home video Archival Footage and Research
1980               Bob Hope Special: Bob Hope's Overseas Christmas Tours I & II (6 hours) NBC TV Researcher
1980               Les Paul "The Wizard of Waushaka" Stray Cat productions Archival Footage
1980               The Ramones "Rock & Roll Radio" Sire Records promotional film Archive Footage
1980               The Doors No One Gets Out Alive Warners Home Video   Archival Footage and Research
1980               John Lennon "Tribute to John Lennon" Scotti Brothers/Syd Vinnedge productions   Archival Footage and Research
1981               George Harrison "All Those Years Ago" Promotional Video Dark Horse Records  Archival Footage and Research
1981               Elvis Presley This Is Elvis    Warner Brothers       VHS, Betamax, Laserdisc & DVD
1981               The Beach Boys 20th Anniversary Special Howard Grossman prods. Archival Footage and Research
1981               The Kinks "Predictable" Arista Records promotional video Archival footage
1981               Portrait of a Legend Scotti Brothers/Syd Vinnedge productions  25 shows  Archival Footage and Research
1982               34th Annual EMMY Awards ABC TV Smith/Hemion Productions Archival Footage and Research
1982               The Beatles Love Me Do  The Beatles    Capitol Records  Co Director & Producer
1982               Nat King Cole TV spot Capitol Records Archive footage
1982               The Beatles Reel Music Movie Medley Promotional Video Capitol Records Archival Footage and Research
1982               Heart of Gold  Canadian Music artists history Archival Footage and Research
1982               It Came From Hollywood Feature Film for Paramount Pictures Researcher
1982               Phil Spector Story BBC TV  Archival footage
1982               When The Music's Over HBO / Appleland productions 1 hour special Archival Footage and Research
1983               The Rolling Stones  Let's Spend the Night Together feature film Hal Ashby   Archival Footage and Research
1983               Girl Groups MGM /UA Home Video 1 hour    Archival Footage and Research
1983               The Beatles 20 Greatest Hits    TV spot Capitol Records Archive footage
1983               Prime Times   1-Hour NBC Comedy Pilot Researcher
1983               Motown Records 25th Anniversary TV Special NBC 2 Hours Archival Footage and Research
1983               That's Television Entertainment NBC Smith/Hemion Productions 2 Hour Special 
1983               Paul McCartney MTV interview Archival Footage
1982               34th Annual EMMY Awards ABC TV Smith/Hemion Productions Archival Footage and Research
1983               The Beatles Please Please Me (3 versions)  The Beatles    Capitol Records  Co Director & Producer
1983               35th Annual EMMY Awards ABC TV Smith/Hemion Productions Archival Footage and Research
1984               The Beatles 20th Anniversary   TV spot Capitol Records Archive footage
1984               The Beatles I Want To Hold Your Hand The Beatles    Capitol Records  Co Director & Producer
1984               Super Night of Rock and Roll  2-Hour NBC Special Malcolm Leo Productions Archival Footage and Research
1984               The Beach Boys An American Band   VHS, Betamax, Laserdisc & DVD   Associate Producer
1985               The Doors: Dance on Fire Universal Home Video   Archival Footage and Research
1986               The Monkees "Zor & Zam" 20th Anniversary concert video shown on stage Created and Edited
1987               The Beatles in Help!  Criterion Collection - Voyager Company Produced and Compiled Side four "The Help! Scrapbook"
1987               Elvis Presley "Elvis '56" Levon Helm Alan Raymond    Archival Footage and Research
1987               Rolling Stone Presents Twenty Years of Rock & Roll (TV documentary)   Archival Footage and Research
1988               The Smithereens  Only A Memory (joke version video)   Directed, Produced, Filmed,& Edited
1988               The Beatles Magical Mystery Tour  The Beatles   VHS, Betamax, & Laserdisc   Restoration film & remix multitrack audio
1988               John Lennon "Imagine: John Lennon", Warner Bros Feature Film  Archival Footage and Research
1989               The Rolling Stones "25 x 5: The Continuing Adventure of The Rolling Stones", Sony    Archival Footage and Research
1990		    Elvis Presley  Elvis: The Great Performances, Buena Vista Home Video, Archival Footage and Research, Editor of "Unchained Melody"
1991               The Beatles The First US Visit   Apple/ MPI    VHS,  Laserdisc & DVD The Beatles	  Production Coordination, Film Restoration
1994               The Beatles The Making Of A Hard Days Night "You Can't Do That" VHS, Laserdisc & DVD   The Beatles    Apple/ MPI Home Video       Producer
1995               The Beatles The Beatles Anthology   Film & Video Restoration & Research
1996               Music Scene “The Best of 1969-1970”     Volumes 1-4  MPI Home Video Laserdisc, VHS, & DVD   Compilation, Restoration and Producer
1996               Hullabaloo “A 1960s Music Flashback”    Volumes 1-12 MPI Home Video Laserdisc, VHS, & DVD  Compilation, Restoration and Producer
2009               Rock & Roll Hall of Fame induction ceremony Archival Footage
2010               Rock & Roll Hall of Fame induction ceremony Archival Footage
2011               Rock & Roll Hall of Fame induction ceremony Archival Footage
2011               The Hollies: Look Through Any Window 1963-1975 Reelin' In The Years productions  Thanks
2013               The Cowsills Family Band Showtime Documentary Archival Footage and Research
2014               CNN presents 'The Sixties – "The British Invasion" Archival Footage and Research
2014               PBS presents "The Dave Clark Five And Beyond"   Archival Footage and Research
2015               The Beatles "1"  DVD / Blu-ray release  Archival Footage and Research

Partial discography

LP Vinyl Records
1980             Beatles Rarities    The Beatles   Capitol Records
1981             This Is Elvis           Elvis Presley  RCA Victor Records
1982             Reel Music            The Beatles   Capitol Records
1987              Rarities                  The Hollies    EMI
1988             Capitol Collectors Series     Hank Thompson  Capitol Records
1989             Never Before         The Byrds      Murray Hill
1990             The Great Performances     Elvis Presley   RCA Victor Records
1990             The Capitol Years   Frank Sinatra    Capitol Records      [5 Lp Set]
1990             Cole, Christmas, & Kids,   Nat King Cole      Capitol Records
1992	      The Best of James Bond: 30th Anniversary (2 Lp Set)  EMI   Various Artists
1991            James Taylor Debut Album  Apple Records
Magic Christian Music  Badfinger (2 LP Set)
That's The Way God Planned It  Billy Preston  (2 Lp Set)
Wonderwall Music  George Harrison
Electronic Sound	 George Harrison
Is This What You Want?	 Jackie Lomax  (2 Lp Set)
Maybe Tomorrow	 The Iveys   (2 Lp Set)
Post Card	 Mary Hopkin   (2 Lp Set)
No Dice	 Badfinger     (2 Lp Set)
Rhada Krsna Temple	 The Radha Krsna Temple
 Straight Up	 Badfinger    (2 Lp Set)
 Tim Hardin Lost in LA 45 RPM Lp Disc (2018 Record Store Day Release)

Partial Compact Disc Discography

External links
 

Living people
American record producers
Year of birth missing (living people)
Place of birth missing (living people)